Events in the year 2020 in Iraq.

Incumbents
President: Barham Salih 
Prime Minister: Adil Abdul-Mahdi (until May 7); Mustafa Al-Kadhimi (from May 7)

Events

January
 January 3 – A U.S. coordinated airstrike near Baghdad International Airport kills Iranian military official Qasem Soleimani and Abu Mahdi al-Muhandis, deputy chief of the Popular Mobilization Forces.
 January 8 – Iran's Islamic Revolutionary Guard Corps launched ballistic missiles at the Ayn al-Asad airbase in Al Anbar Governorate, western Iraq and Erbil, Iraqi Kurdistan, in response to the killing of Major General Qasem Soleimani by a United States drone strike.
 January 12 – Hundreds of Iraqis attend protests over deaths of two reporters in Basra.
 January 21 – An Iraqi female protester was shot dead by government forces. 49-year-old Jannat Madhi was working in a medical team giving help to wounded demonstrators. She was shot around mid-night in the Iraqi southern port of Basra.

February
 February 5 – Eight people were shot dead in Najaf after supporters of Muqtada al-Sadr raided an anti-government protest camp.
 February 24 – COVID-19 pandemic in Iraq, the first case of COVID-19 is recorded in Najaf Governorate.

July
 July 6 – Historian and researcher Hashim al-Hashimi is killed by unknown gunmen.

September
 The World Bank said Iraq's poverty rate could double to 40 percent by the end of this year and that youth unemployment, currently standing at 36 percent, could rise to even higher numbers.
 A wayward rocket intended for US troops posted at Baghdad airport hit and killed five children and two women all belonging to the same family. When the rockets hit, the children were playing outside their home. The latest attack intended to strike American interests was one of around 40 since early August. Several senior officials attended the funeral in a move to calm the tense situation.

Deaths

January 3 – Abu Mahdi al-Muhandis, military commander (b. 1954).
April 10 – Rifat Chadirji, architect.
May 16 – Mizban Khadr al-Hadi, general and politician.
June 12 – Ali Hadi, footballer (b. 1967).
June 14 – Tawfiq al-Yasiri, politician.
June 21 – Ahmed Radhi, footballer (b. 1964).
June 22 – Nouri Dhiab, footballer (b. 1943).
June 24 – Mohammed Yaseen Mohammed, weightlifter (b. 1963).
July 6 – Hisham al-Hashimi, historian and researcher (b. 1973).
July 19 – Sultan Hashim Ahmad al-Tai, former Defense Minister.
July 28 – Ahlam Wehbi, singer and actress (b. 1938).
August 19 – Reham Yacoub, doctor and civilian rights activist (b. 1991).
September 11 – Nadhim Shaker, footballer (b. 1958).
October 25 – Izzat Ibrahim al-Douri, politician (b. 1942).
November 18 – Firsat Sofi, Governor of Erbil (b. 1978).

See also

Country overviews
 Iraq
 History of Iraq
 History of modern Iraq
 Outline of Iraq
 Government of Iraq
 Politics of Iraq
 Timeline of Iraq history
 Years in Iraq

Related timelines for current period
 2020
 2020 in politics and government
 2020s

References

 
2020s in Iraq
Years of the 21st century in Iraq
Iraq
Iraq